Katha laevis is a moth of the family Erebidae. It is found in Japan.

The wingspan is 32–35 mm.

References

Moths described in 1877
Lithosiina
Moths of Japan